Ammunition is the material fired, scattered, dropped,  or detonated from any weapon or weapon system. Ammunition is both expendable weapons (e.g., bombs, missiles, grenades, land mines) and the component parts of other weapons that create the effect on a target (e.g., bullets and warheads).

The purpose of ammunition is to project a force against a selected target to have an effect (usually, but not always, lethal). An example of ammunition is the firearm cartridge, which includes all components required to deliver the weapon effect in a single package. Until the 20th century, black powder was the most common propellant used but has now been replaced in nearly all cases by modern compounds.

Ammunition comes in a great range of sizes and types and is often designed to work only in specific weapons systems. However, there are internationally recognized standards for certain ammunition types (e.g., 5.56×45mm NATO) that enable their use across different weapons and by different users. There are also specific types of ammunition that are designed to have a specialized effect on a target, such as armor-piercing shells and tracer ammunition, used only in certain circumstances. Ammunition is commonly labeled or colored in a specific manner to assist in its identification and to prevent the wrong ammunition types from being used accidentally or inappropriately.

Glossary 

 A round is a single cartridge containing a projectile, propellant, primer and casing.
A shell is a form of ammunition that is fired by a large caliber cannon or artillery piece. Before the mid-19th century, these shells were usually made of solid materials and relied on kinetic energy to have an effect. However, since that time, they are more often filled with high explosives (see artillery).
 A shot refers to a single release of a weapons system. This may involve firing just one round or piece of ammunition (e.g., from a semi-automatic firearm), but can also refer to ammunition types that release a large number of projectiles at the same time (e.g., cluster munitions or shotgun shells). 
 A dud refers to loaded ammunition that fails to function as intended, typically failing to detonate on landing. However, it can also refer to ammunition that fails to fire inside the weapon, known as a misfire, or when the ammunition only partially functions, known as a hang fire. Dud ammunition, which is classified as an unexploded ordnance (UXO), is regarded as highly dangerous. In former conflict zones, it is not uncommon for dud ammunition to remain buried in the ground for many years. Large quantities of ammunition from World War I continue to be regularly found in fields throughout France and Belgium and occasionally still claim lives. Although classified as a UXO, landmines that have been left behind after conflict are not considered duds as they have not failed to work and may still be fully functioning.
 A bomb or, more specifically, a guided or unguided bomb (also called an aircraft bomb or aerial bomb), is typically an airdropped, unpowered explosive weapon. Mines and the warheads used in guided missiles and rockets are also referred to as bomb-type ammunition.

Etymology
The term ammunition can be traced back to the mid-17th century. The word comes from the French la munition, for the material used for war. Ammunition and munition are often used interchangeably, although munition now usually refers to the actual weapons system with the ammunition required to operate it. In some languages other than English ammunition is still referred to as munition, such as French ("munitions"), German ("Munition"), Italian ("munizione") and Portuguese ("munição").

Design 

Ammunition design has evolved throughout history as different weapons have been developed and different effects required. Historically, ammunition was of relatively simple design and build (e.g., sling-shot, stones hurled by catapults), but as weapon designs developed (e.g., rifling) and became more refined, the need for more specialized ammunition increased. Modern ammunition can vary significantly in quality but is usually manufactured to very high standards.

For example, ammunition for hunting can be designed to expand inside a target, maximizing the damage inflicted by one round. Anti-personnel shells are designed to fragment into many pieces and can affect a large area. Armor-piercing rounds are specially hardened to penetrate armor, while smoke ammunition covers an area with a fog that screens people from view. More generic ammunition (e.g., 5.56×45mm NATO) can often be altered slightly to give it a more specific effect (e.g., tracer, incendiary), whilst larger explosive rounds can be altered by using different fuzes.

Components

The components of ammunition intended for rifles and munitions may be divided into these categories:
 fuze or primer
 explosive materials and propellants
 projectiles of all kinds
 cartridge casing

Fuzes 

The term fuze refers to the detonator of an explosive round or shell. The spelling is different in British English and American English (fuse/fuze respectively) and they are unrelated to a fuse (electrical). A fuse was earlier used to ignite the propellant (e.g., such as on a firework) until the advent of more reliable systems such as the primer or igniter that is used in most modern ammunition.

The fuze of a weapon can be used to alter how the ammunition works. For example, a common artillery shell fuze can be set to "point detonation" (detonation when it hits a target), delay (detonate after it has hit and penetrated a target), time-delay (explode a specified time after firing or impact) and proximity (explode above or next to a target without hitting it, such as for airburst effects or anti-aircraft shells). These allow a single ammunition type to be altered to suit the situation it is required for. There are many designs of a fuze, ranging from simple mechanical to complex radar and barometric systems.

Fuzes are usually armed by the acceleration force of firing the projectile, and usually arm several meters after clearing the bore of the weapon. This helps to ensure the ammunition is safer to handle when loading into the weapon and reduces the chance of the detonator firing before the ammunition has cleared the weapon.

Propellant or explosive 

The propellant is the component of ammunition that is activated inside the weapon and provides the kinetic energy required to move the projectile from the weapon to the target. Before the use of gunpowder, this energy would have been produced mechanically by the weapons system (e.g., a catapult or crossbow); in modern times, it is usually a form of chemical energy that rapidly burns to create kinetic force, and an appropriate amount of chemical propellant is packaged with each round of ammunition. In recent years, compressed gas, magnetic energy and electrical energy have been used as propellants.

Until the 20th-century, gunpowder was the most common propellant in ammunition. However, it has since been replaced by a wide range of fast-burning compounds that are more reliable and efficient.

The propellant charge is distinct from the projectile charge which is activated by the fuze, which causes the ammunition effect (e.g., the exploding of an artillery round).

Cartridge case or container 

The cartridge is the container that holds the projectile and propellant. Not all ammunition types have a cartridge case. In its place, a wide range of materials can be used to contain the explosives and parts. With some large weapons, the ammunition components are stored separately until loaded into the weapon system for firing. With small arms, caseless ammunition can reduce the weight and cost of ammunition, and simplify the firing process for increased firing rate, but the maturing technology has functionality issues.

Projectile 
The projectile is the part of the ammunition that leaves the weapon and has the effect on the target. This effect is usually either kinetic (e.g., as with a standard bullet) or through the delivery of explosives.

Storage 

An ammunition dump is a military facility for the storage of live ammunition and explosives that will be distributed and used at a later date. Such a storage facility is extremely hazardous, with the potential for accidents when unloading, packing, and transferring the ammunition. In the event of a fire or explosion, the site and its surrounding area is immediately evacuated and the stored ammunition is left to detonate itself completely with limited attempts at firefighting from a safe distance. In large facilities, there may be a flooding system to automatically extinguish a fire or prevent an explosion. Typically, an ammunition dump will have a large buffer zone surrounding it, to avoid casualties in the event of an accident. There will also be perimeter security measures in place to prevent access by unauthorized personnel and to guard against the potential threat from enemy forces.

A magazine is a place where a quantity of ammunition or other explosive material is stored temporarily prior to being used. The term may be used for a facility where large quantities of ammunition are stored, although this would normally be referred to as an ammunition dump. Magazines are typically located in the field for quick access when engaging the enemy. The ammunition storage area on a warship is referred to as the "ship's magazine". On a smaller scale, magazine is also the name given to the ammunition storage and feeding device of a repeating firearm.

Gunpowder must be stored in a dry place (stable room temperature) to keep it usable, as long as for 10 years. It is also recommended to avoid hot places, because friction or heat might ignite a spark and cause an explosion.

Common types

Small arms 

The standard weapon of a modern soldier is an assault rifle, which, like other small arms, uses cartridge ammunition in a size specific to the weapon. Ammunition is carried on the person in box magazines specific to the weapon, ammunition boxes, pouches or bandoliers. The amount of ammunition carried is dependent on the strength of the soldier, the expected action required, and the ability of ammunition to move forward through the logistical chain to replenish the supply. A soldier may also carry a smaller amount of specialized ammunition for heavier weapons such as machine guns and mortars, spreading the burden for squad weapons over many people. Too little ammunition poses a threat to the mission, while too much limits the soldier's mobility also being a threat to the mission.

Shells 

A shell is a payload-carrying projectile which, as opposed to a shot, contains explosives or other fillings, in use since the 19th century.

Artillery 

Artillery shells are ammunition that is designed to be fired from artillery which has an effect over long distances, usually indirectly (i.e., out of sight of the target). There are many different types of artillery ammunition, but they are usually high-explosive and designed to shatter into fragments on impact to maximize damage. The fuze used on an artillery shell can alter how it explodes or behaves so it has a more specialized effect. Common types of artillery ammunition include high explosive, smoke, illumination, and practice rounds. Some artillery rounds are designed as cluster munitions. Artillery ammunition will almost always include a projectile (the only exception being demonstration or blank rounds), fuze and propellant of some form. When a cartridge case is not used, there will be some other method of containing the propellant bags, usually a breech-loading weapon; see Breechloader.

Tank 

Tank ammunition was developed in WWI as tanks first appeared on the battlefield. However, as tank-on-tank warfare developed (including the development of anti-tank warfare artillery), more specialized forms of ammunition were developed such as high-explosive anti-tank (HEAT) warheads and armour-piercing discarding sabot (APDS), including armour-piercing fin-stabilized discarding sabot (APFSDS) rounds. The development of shaped charges has had a significant impact on anti-tank ammunition design, now common in both tank-fired ammunition and in anti-tank missiles, including anti-tank guided missiles.

Naval 
 
Naval weapons were originally the same as many land-based weapons, but the ammunition was designed for specific use, such as a solid shot designed to hole an enemy ship and chain-shot to cut rigging and sails. Modern naval engagements have occurred over far longer distances than historic battles, so as ship armor has increased in strength and thickness, the ammunition to defeat it has also changed. Naval ammunition is now designed to reach very high velocities (to improve its armor-piercing abilities) and may have specialized fuzes to defeat specific types of vessels. However, due to the extended ranges at which modern naval combat may occur, guided missiles have largely supplanted guns and shells.

Aircraft and anti-aircraft

Logistics 

With every successive improvement in military arms, a corresponding modification has occurred in the method of supplying ammunition in the quantity required. As soon as projectiles were required (such as javelins and arrows), there needed to be a method of replenishment. When non-specialized, interchangeable or recoverable ammunition was used (e.g., arrows), it was possible to pick up spent arrows (both friendly and enemy) and reuse them. However, with the advent of explosive or non-recoverable ammunition, this was no longer possible and new supplies of ammunition would be needed.

The weight of ammunition required, particularly for artillery shells, can be considerable, causing a need for extra time to replenish supplies. In modern times, there has been an increase in the standardization of many ammunition types between allies (e.g., the NATO Standardization Agreement) that has allowed for shared ammunition types (e.g., 5.56×45mm NATO).

Environmental problems
 lead-based ammunition production is the second-largest annual use of lead in the US, accounting for over 60,000 metric tons consumed in 2012. In contrast to the closed-loop nature of the largest annual use of lead (i.e. for lead-acid batteries, nearly all of which are, at the end of their lives, collected and recycled into new lead-acid batteries), the lead in ammunition ends up being almost entirely dispersed into the natural environment.  For example, lead bullets that miss their target or remain in a carcass or body that was never retrieved can very easily enter environmental systems and become toxic to wildlife. The US military has experimented with replacing lead with copper as a slug in their green bullets which reduces the dangers posed by lead in the environment as a result of artillery. Since 2010, this has eliminated over 2000 tons of lead in waste streams.

Hunters are also encouraged to use monolithic bullets, which exclude any lead content.

Unexploded ordnance 

Unexploded ammunition can remain active for a very long time and poses a significant threat to both humans and the environment.

See also

 Air travel with firearms and ammunition
 Ammunition box
 Ammunition column
 Armor-piercing shell
 Breaching round
 Expanding bullet
 Full metal jacket bullet
 Handloading
 High-explosive incendiary
 Hollow-point bullet
 Howitzer
 International Ammunition Association
 KE munition
 List of handgun cartridges
 List of rifle cartridges
 Naval artillery
 Proximity fuze
 Rotation of ammunition
 Shot (pellet)
 Table of handgun and rifle cartridges
 Tubes and primers for ammunition

References

External links

 European Ammunition Box Translations
 International Ammunition Association

 
Explosives
Weapons